Sir David Osborne Hay,  (29 November 1916 – 18 May 2009) was an Australian soldier, senior public servant and diplomat, who served as Australian Ambassador to the United Nations, Administrator of Papua New Guinea, and headed the departments of External Territories and Aboriginal Affairs.

Early life career
David Hay was born in 1916 in Corowa, New South Wales, where his parents had a grazing property. He attended Geelong Grammar School, becoming school captain and joint dux with Rupert Hamer, later Premier of Victoria.  A member of the Geelong Grammar cricket team, he scored 284 runs in an innings, a record that stood for 60 years.

He studied at Oxford University, reading classics, ancient history and philosophy at Brasenose College, graduating with second-class honours, and playing cricket for the university team. He returned to Australia to join the public service, but found the fact that his degree was not from an Australian university was a barrier to entry. He continued studying, at Melbourne University.

David Hay joined the Treasury in 1939, moving to the Department of External Affairs shortly before the start of World War II. He joined the 2/6th Battalion, served in the Middle East, Greece and New Guinea, and rose to the rank of major. He married Alison Adams in 1944 and he returned to the war, earning the Distinguished Service Order (DSO) in 1945. After the war, he was lieutenant colonel commanding the 3rd Battalion in the Citizens' Military Forces.

Public servant and diplomat
He returned to the public service and was appointed official secretary to the Australian High Commission in Ottawa, Ontario, Canada. He then spent a year at the Royal College of Defence Studies in Britain. He was appointed Australian Ambassador to Thailand, and played an important role in the early days of the Southeast Asia Treaty Organization (SEATO). In 1961 he returned to Canada as High Commissioner, from where he was appointed Ambassador to the United Nations 1964–65.

He was appointed Administrator of Papua and New Guinea, then an Australian territory, from 23 December 1966 (he arrived on 9 January 1967). This was in the period leading up to Papua New Guinea's self-government (1973) and independence (1975).  His time was marred by clashes with the head of the Department of External Territories, George Warwick Smith, and he also made decisions without consulting the Minister for External Territories, Charles "Ceb" Barnes. In 1970 Hay spoke to the Prime Minister, John Gorton, after which Smith was moved to the Department of the Interior, Hay himself being appointed in Smith's place to head External Territories. The new PNG Administrator was Leslie Wilson Johnson, with whom Hay had a fruitful and positive relationship.

The Department of External Territories was abolished by the Whitlam government in 1973, and Hay was appointed Australia's first Military Ombudsman. He was appointed secretary of the Department of Aboriginal Affairs in 1976 by the Fraser government, retiring in 1979 on health grounds.

Later life
Hay wrote a history of the 2/6th Battalion, Nothing Over Us. He bought back his birthplace Boomanoomana homestead and restored the old family house, garden, outbuildings and land, and wrote a biography of his great-grandfather, The Life And Times of William Hay of Boomanoomana, 1816–1908.

He was made a Member of the Order of the British Empire (MBE) in 1943, a Commander (CBE) in 1963, and was awarded a knighthood in 1979.

Sir David Hay's wife, Alison, died in 2002. He died on 18 May 2009, aged 92. He was survived by two sons and three granddaughters (all of whom went to Geelong Grammar School), and a daughter-in-law.

References

Further reading

 
 

|-

|-

|-

|-

|-

1916 births
2009 deaths
Alumni of Brasenose College, Oxford
Ambassadors of Australia to Thailand
Australian colonels
Australian cricketers
Australian Knights Bachelor
Australian Army personnel of World War II
Australian Commanders of the Order of the British Empire
Australian Companions of the Distinguished Service Order
Cricketers from New South Wales
High Commissioners of Australia to Canada
Oxford University cricketers
Permanent Representatives of Australia to the United Nations
Administrators of Papua and New Guinea